Statistics of Czechoslovak First League in the 1974–1975 season.

Overview
It was contested by 16 teams, and ŠK Slovan Bratislava won the championship. Ladislav Petráš was the league's top scorer with 20 goals.

Stadia and locations

League standings

Results

Top goalscorers

References

Czechoslovakia - List of final tables (RSSSF)

Czechoslovak First League seasons
Czech
1974–75 in Czechoslovak football